Blackhorse Lane tram stop is a light rail stop in the London Borough of Croydon in the southern suburbs of London.

The tram stop is located on a section of line which follows the trackbed of the former Woodside and South Croydon Railway, and is adjacent to the point at which that railway's branch to Addiscombe station diverged from the line between Elmers End station and Sanderstead station. Prior to the opening of Tramlink, there was no station at this site which had previously contained long-disused allotments.

Services
Blackhorse Lane is served by tram services operated by Tramlink.

On Saturday evenings and Sundays, the service is reduced to a tram every 7-8 minutes in each direction, with trams every 15 minutes to Elmers End and Beckenham Junction.

Services are operated using Bombardier CR4000 and Stadler Variobahn Trams.

Connections
The stop is served by London Buses route 197 which provides connections to Peckham, Sydenham and Croydon Town Centre.

Free interchange for journeys made within an hour is available between bus services and between buses and trams is available at Woodside as part of Transport for London's Hopper Fare.

References

External links

Blackhorse Lane tram Stop – Timetables and live departures at Transport for London

Tramlink stops in the London Borough of Croydon
Railway stations in Great Britain opened in 2000